A microdeletion syndrome is a syndrome caused by a chromosomal deletion smaller than 5 million base pairs (5 Mb) spanning several genes that is too small to be detected by conventional cytogenetic methods or high resolution karyotyping (2–5 Mb). Detection is done by fluorescence in situ hybridization (FISH). Larger chromosomal deletion syndromes are detectable using karyotyping techniques.

Examples
 DiGeorge syndrome or velocardiofacial syndrome – most common microdeletion syndrome
 Prader–Willi syndrome
 Angelman syndrome
 Neurofibromatosis type I
 Neurofibromatosis type II
 Williams syndrome
 Miller–Dieker syndrome
 Smith–Magenis syndrome
 Rubinstein–Taybi syndrome
 Wolf–Hirschhorn syndrome

References

Further reading
 
 Microdeletions and Molecular Genetics
 Microdeletion syndromes (chromosomes 1 to 11) on UpToDate
 List of 100 microdeletion/duplication syndromes detected by array-CGH on GENOMA
 
 
 
 13 chromosomal disorders you may not have heard of

Autosomal monosomies and deletions
Syndromes